Paramount Network is a Spanish free-to-air television network primarily programmed in a general entertainment format. 
It was originally launched on March 30, 2012, as Paramount Channel, primarily broadcasting films from the 1980s and 1990s, as well as recent television series.
In May 2018, Viacom announced that the Spanish version of the channel would re-launch as Paramount Network (itself a relaunch of the former U.S. network Spike) on 10 June 2018, switching to a general entertainment format with television series and films.

Programming
 Charmed
 Columbo
 Father Brown
 The Librarians
 Alice Nevers
 Atrapa a un ladrón
 Agatha Christie: Miss Marple
 Agatha Christie's Poirot
 Alaska y Mario
 Alice Nevers
 Cazatesoros
 Central de cómicos
 Cinexpress
 Candice Renoir
 Diagnosis: Murder
 Don Matteo
 Endeavour
 Father Brown (2013 TV series)
 Fotogramas TV
 Gotham
 Grantchester
 Houdini & Doyle
 Informe criminal
 La Señora
 Little House on the Prairie
 Los vecinos en guerra
 Man in an Orange Shirt
 Mary Higgins Clark
 Midsomer Murders
 Miss Fisher's Murder Mysteries
 MovieBerto
 Murder, She Wrote
 Murdoch Mysteries
 NCIS: Los Angeles
 NCIS: New Orleans
 Papel pintado
 Pata negra
 Peliculeros
 Scorpion
 Section de recherches
 Sherlock
 The Fresh Prince of Bel-Air
 Un passo dal cielo
 Waco
 Yellowstone

References

Television networks in Spain
Paramount Network